Jaramit Weffer (born 3 November 1985) is a Venezuelan freestyle wrestler.

She competed in the women's freestyle 75 kg event at the 2016 Summer Olympics, in which she was eliminated in the round of 16 by Annabelle Ali.

References

External links
 

1985 births
Living people
Venezuelan female sport wrestlers
Olympic wrestlers of Venezuela
Wrestlers at the 2016 Summer Olympics
Pan American Games medalists in wrestling
Pan American Games bronze medalists for Venezuela
Wrestlers at the 2011 Pan American Games
Medalists at the 2011 Pan American Games
Wrestlers at the 2015 Pan American Games
21st-century Venezuelan women